The men's wakeboard freestyle competition in water skiing at the 2017 World Games took place from 25 to 27 July 2017 at the Old Odra River in Wrocław, Poland.

Competition format
A total of 18 athletes entered the competition. In quarterfinals two best athletes qualifies to the next round. Athletes who can't qualify through quarterfinals takes last chance qualifiers, from which the best athlete qualifies to semifinals. From semifinals three best athletes qualifies to the final.

Results

Quarterfinals

Heat 1

Heat 3

Heat 2

Heat 4

Last Chance Qualifiers

Heat 1

Heat 2

Semifinals

Heat 1

Heat 2

Final

References 

Water skiing at the 2017 World Games
2017 World Games